Haploviricotina is a subphylum of viruses in the phylum Negarnaviricota. It is one of only two virus subphyla, the other being Polyploviricotina, which is also in Negarnaviricota.

Taxonomy 

The subphylum Haploviricotina is composed of 4 classes and 5 orders:

 Chunqiuviricetes
 Muvirales
 Milneviricetes
 Serpentovirales
 Monjiviricetes
 Jingchuvirales
 Mononegavirales
 Yunchangviricetes
 Goujianvirales

References

Negarnaviricota
Virus subphyla